Danok Bat Club de Fica is a Spanish football team based in Bilbao, in the autonomous community of Basque Country. Founded in 1972, the club is mainly known for their successful youth setup, which helps players to develop and join other senior clubs in the region.

Their Juvenil A squad play in the Group II of the División de Honor Juvenil de Fútbol. The opponents in the league group include other clubs whose adult departments compete at various levels from La Liga down to Tercera División, another strong youth-only organisation, Antiguoko, and the academy teams of Real Sociedad, Osasuna and Athletic Bilbao, who have a fruitful collaborative agreement with Danok Bat. 

The Juvenil B team plays in the Liga Nacional Juvenil de Fútbol, which is the lower division of the same structure, and the Juvenil C team participates in the Liga Vasca one tier further down – as with adult leagues, the different teams cannot coincide at the same level.

Season to season (Juvenil A)

División de Honor Juvenil
Seasons with two or more trophies shown in bold

Famous players
 
Note: List consists of players who appeared in La Liga or reached international status.

References

External links
 
Futbolme team profile 
Federacíon Guipuzcoana de Fútbol profile 

Football clubs in the Basque Country (autonomous community)
Association football clubs established in 1972
1972 establishments in Spain
División de Honor Juvenil de Fútbol
Sports teams in Bilbao